Aluf Amikam Norkin (born December 20, 1966) is an Israeli general, who served as commander of the Israeli Air Force from 2017 to 2022. Before his selection to succeed Amir Eshel as commander of the IAF, Norkin served as head of the IDF Planning Directorate.

Biography
Norkin was born in Beit She'arim to olim of Romanian-Jewish origin. He was drafted in the IDF Armour Corps in 1984, and graduated from the IAF Flight Academy as a fighter pilot in July 1987. In 1988, he joined the "Knights of the Twin Tail" Squadron and became the youngest F-15 pilot in the world. In the beginning of the 90s, he flew the Kurnass 2000 variant of the F-4 Phantom II out of Hatzerim, and participated in bombing sorties during Operation Accountability. A number of years later, Norkin was appointed First Deputy Squadron Commander of the "Golden Eagle" Squadron and participated in Operation Grapes of Wrath. His next position was Head of the IAF Operations Department. Between 1999 and 2002 Norkin was Commander of the "Knights of the Twin Tail" Squadron. In 2003 he was chosen to integrate the IAF's new F-16I aircraft as Commander of the "Negev" Squadron.

From 2009 to 2012, Norkin, now a Brigadier General, acted as Commander of Tel Nof AFB, and was appointed Head of IAF Training & Doctrine Division in 2012. In August 2014, he was appointed IAF Chief of Air Staff  until June 2015, when he was promoted to the rank of Major General and was appointed Head of the IDF Planning Directorate.

On August 10, 2017, Norkin was appointed Commander of the IAF, replacing Major General Amir Eshel.

Norkin completed his term as commander of the IAF on April 4, 2022. He was succeeded by Tomer Bar.

Awards and decorations
:
 Second Lebanon War
 South Lebanon Security Zone 
 Operation Protective Edge
:
 Commander of the Order of Merit of the Federal Republic of Germany (2021)
:
 Commander of the Legion of Merit (2019)

References

Israeli Air Force generals
Israeli aviators
Israeli Jews
University of Haifa alumni
Israeli people of Romanian-Jewish descent
1966 births
Living people
Commanders Crosses of the Order of Merit of the Federal Republic of Germany
Commanders of the Legion of Merit
Foreign recipients of the Legion of Merit